Philip Dickinson Shutler (born October 13, 1926) was a lieutenant general in the United States Marine Corps. His commands included service as the Deputy Commandant for Aviation for the Marine Corps from 1974 to 1975 and Director of Operations, Joint Staff, J-3. He graduated from the United States Naval Academy in 1948.

References

1926 births
Living people
United States Marine Corps generals